Ludwik Oli (17 December 1898 – 1943) was a Polish architect. He graduated from the Ecole Speciale d'Architecture in Paris. He was a member of SARP. His work was part of the architecture event in the art competition at the 1928 Summer Olympics.

He lived in Łódź where he had his office. In 1943 during German occupation he was shot and killed in Lwów.

References

1898 births
1943 deaths
20th-century Polish architects
Olympic competitors in art competitions
Architects from Łódź
Polish civilians killed in World War II
Polish people executed by Nazi Germany
École Spéciale d'Architecture alumni
Deaths by firearm in Ukraine